South Fork Township is one of seventeen townships in Christian County, Illinois, USA. As of the 2020 census, its population was 2,565, and it contained 1,242 housing units.

Geography
The township contains Sangchris Lake State Recreation Area.

Cities, towns, villages
 Bulpitt
 Jeisyville
 Kincaid
 Tovey

Unincorporated towns
 Ellis at 
 Sicily at 
 Tovey Humphrey Station at

Cemeteries
The township contains cemeteries: Achenback Lutheran, Bethany, Anderson and Finley.

Major highways
  Illinois Route 104

Demographics
As of the 2020 census there were 2,565 people, 1,139 households, and 677 families residing in the township. The racial makeup of the township was 94.58% White, 0.39% African American, 0.23% Native American, 0.19% Asian, 0.00% Pacific Islander, 0.27% from other races, and 4.33% from two or more races. Hispanic or Latino of any race were 1.05% of the population.

There were 1,139 households, out of which 23.10% had children under the age of 18 living with them, 47.67% were married couples living together, 7.64% had a female householder with no spouse present, and 40.56% were non-families. 29.10% of all households were made up of individuals, and 11.80% had someone living alone who was 65 years of age or older. The average household size was 2.28 and the average family size was 2.86.

The township's age distribution consisted of 17.7% under the age of 18, 10.9% from 18 to 24, 22.9% from 25 to 44, 31.4% from 45 to 64, and 17.0% who were 65 years of age or older. The median age was 43.7 years. For every 100 females, there were 107.0 males. For every 100 females age 18 and over, there were 104.9 males.

The median income for a household in the township was $62,813, and the median income for a family was $84,297. Males had a median income of $56,705 versus $31,719 for females. The per capita income for the township was $37,868. About 4.4% of families and 10.4% of the population were below the poverty line, including 11.1% of those under age 18 and 13.3% of those age 65 or over.

School districts
 Edinburg Community Unit School District 4
 Morrisonville Community Unit School District 1
 Pawnee Community Unit School District 11
 South Fork School District 14
 Taylorville Community Unit School District 3

Political districts
 State House District 98
 State Senate District 49

References
 
 United States Census Bureau 2009 TIGER/Line Shapefiles
 United States National Atlas

External links
 City-Data.com
 Illinois State Archives
 Township Officials of Illinois

Townships in Christian County, Illinois
Townships in Illinois